

Films

References

 
2021
2021 in LGBT history
2021-related lists